Uranium oxide is an oxide of the element uranium.

The metal uranium forms several oxides:
 Uranium dioxide or uranium(IV) oxide (UO2, the mineral uraninite or pitchblende)
 Diuranium pentoxide or uranium(V) oxide (U2O5)
 Uranium trioxide or uranium(VI) oxide (UO3)
 Triuranium octoxide (U3O8), the most stable uranium oxide; yellowcake typically contains 70 to 90 percent triuranium octoxide)
 Uranyl peroxide (UO2O2 or UO4)
 Amorphous uranium(VI) oxide (Am-U2O7)

Uranium dioxide is oxidized in contact with oxygen to form triuranium octoxide.

3 UO2 + O2  →  U3O8; at 700 °C (970 K)

Preparation 38
During World War II, "Preparation 38" was the codename for uranium oxide used by German scientists.

References

Oxides
Uranium compounds